Leilani may refer to:


People
Leilani (singer) (born 1978), Leilani Sen, English pop singer
Leilani Bishop (born 1976), American model
Leilani Dowding (born 1980), English model
Leilani Ettel (born 2001), German snowboarder
Leilani Farha, Canadian lawyer and activist
Leilani Jones (actress) (born 1957), American actress
Leilani Kai (born 1960), retired professional wrestler
Leilani Latu (born 1993), Australian rugby league footballer
Leilani Mitchell (born 1985), American-Australian basketball player
Leilani Munter (born 1974), American NASCAR driver
Leilani Rorani (born 1974), New Zealand squash player
Leilani Sarelle (born 1966), American actress
Raven Leilani (born 1990), American author

Arts, entertainment, and media

Films
 Leilani (film), a 1953 Indonesian film starring Awaludin
 The Sterilization of Leilani Muir (1996), a documentary directed by Glynis Whiting

Music
 "Leilani" (song), the debut single released by Australian rock group Hoodoo Gurus in 1982
 "Sweet Leilani", a song by Harry Owens, popularized by Bing Crosby in the film Waikiki Wedding

Other uses
 Leilani (given name)
 Leilani (horse), 1975 Australian Champion Racehorse of the Year
 Leilani Estates, Hawaii, United States of America

Hawaiian names